Grigore Claudio Rîşco (born August 22, 1978), also known as Claudio Rasco, is a retired Romanian boxer.

Amateur

The  Rasco won the bronze medal at the European Championships 1998 in Minsk, 2000 the silver medal losing to Russian Aleksandr Lebziak at the 2000 European Amateur Boxing Championships. At the 2001 World Amateur Boxing Championships he won the bronze medal in Belfast.

Pro

Rasco turned pro in Canada to fight as a Heavyweight. He lost his pro debut but upset heavyweight David Cadieux in his pro debut. In 2005 he lost his bid for the Canadian Cruiserweight title against Troy Ross by stoppage and was KOd in 2006 by undefeated German Cruiserweight prospect Marco Huck.

Professional boxing record

References
 
 

1978 births
Living people
Romanian expatriates in Canada
Boxers at the 2000 Summer Olympics
Olympic boxers of Romania
Romanian male boxers
AIBA World Boxing Championships medalists
Heavyweight boxers